In telecommunications, a Geographical Operations System (GOS) combines the integration of data with geographic mapping ability in a consolidated process for telecommunications companies. The process can be defined as, "...the marriage that integrates Geographic Information Systems (GIS) and Operational Support Systems (OSS) entails..." in a telecommunications company. The goal of a GOS is to enable the spread of information among employees of a company by providing equal access to geographic representation and database information about customers and equipment to ensure the deliverance of services. A Geographical Operations System is meant to provide all employees, from database managers to field technicians and customer service representatives, with fair access to information in order to enhance assistance and response to problems. A GOS is adopted by telecommunications companies to combine maps of the company's service area with database information about the company's customers and equipment.

GOS Software
GOS software relies on a central repository for critical data to foster better communication between the various branches of a telecom. GOS software may offer companies a means to achieve technological convergence in their marketed products. Open Database Connectivity (ODBC) is utilized to create a discernible pathway for retrieving information from GOS software for a range of employees that may not be familiar with database protocols. The software creates a channel within a company for experts to share information on the various aspects of the telecommunications company, thus opening the spread of information and increasing efficiency for employees.

Uniqueness
The increasing pressures of competition and expansion in the telecommunications market have driven many vendors in the field to reassess the internal organization and cooperation. Technological innovation has introduced greater capacity and capabilities in the telecommunications market, but also added complexity for many companies, as they attempt to develop commercial offerings with an ever-growing list of products and services. A Geographical Operations Systems meshes the importance of Geographical Information Systems – which provides the ability to store data in a geographically-correct map – with the reliance of telecommunications companies on Operational Support Systems as a way to categorize and maintain customer and equipment records. 

The Geographical Operations System simplifies interoperability in a telecommunications company by converging resources that may be stored in different programming languages from across the company into a single software program to be utilized by customer satisfaction representatives, equipment technicians, telecommunications engineers, and the accounting department, among others. Information is made general and uniform throughout a company to allow independent employees to carry out tasks without seeking out the expertise and time of coworkers.

Further reading
Flournoy, Chuck (March–April 2008), “Tearing Down the Walls: Using Data Integration to Rethink Telecom Operations Management”, Rural Telecommunications magazine.

References

Geographic information systems
Information systems
Telecommunications systems